Bandage is a South Korean rock band under the label IST Entertainment (formerly Play M Entertainment). The band currently consists of two members: Lee Chan-sol and Shin Hyun-bin. All members are contestants in JTBC's music survival show SuperBand in 2019. Their band name, as a combination of "band" and "windage", expresses the attitude of "growing up to be an influential rock band that brings fresh wind". Originally as four, the band debuted on April 3, 2020, with the digital single album Square One and the title track "Invisibles".

On April 4, 2022, it was announced that Lim Hyeong-bin has left the group due to musical differences. On January 6, 2023, IST Entertainment announced their departure from the agency after terminating their contracts. On January 28, 2023, Kang Kyoung-yoon announced on his Instagram his departure from the group.

Members
Lee Chan-sol (이찬솔) - Vocal, guitar
Shin Hyun-bin (신현빈) - Guitar, sub-vocal

Past members
Kang Kyoung-yoon (강경윤) - Drum
Lim Hyeong-bin (임형빈) - Bass, sub-vocal, keyboard, guitar

Discography

Studio albums

Single albums

Television appearances

External links

References

South Korean rock music groups
IST Entertainment artists
South Korean alternative rock groups
Musical groups established in 2020
Musical groups from Seoul
2020 establishments in South Korea